Sukharev or Suharev is a Russian masculine surname, its feminine counterpart is Sukhareva or Suhareva. It may refer to
Alexandru Suharev (born 1970), Moldovan football player
Grunya Sukhareva (1891–1981), Russian child psychiatrist
Ivan Sukharev (born 1978), Russian politician
Maria Sukhareva, Russian correspondence chess player 
Olga Sukhareva (born 1963), Russian correspondence chess player
Sergei Sukharev (born 1987), Russian football player
Victoria Sukhareva (born 1990), Russian acrobatic gymnast
Vladimir Sukharev (1924–1997), Soviet sprinter

See also
Sukharev Tower in Moscow, Russia

Russian-language surnames